The 2022–23 Western Michigan Broncos men's basketball team represented Western Michigan University in the 2022–23 NCAA Division I men's basketball season. The Broncos, led by first-year head coach Dwayne Stephens, played their home games at University Arena in Kalamazoo, Michigan as members of the Mid-American Conference. They finished 8–23 with a 4–14 MAC record.  They finished last in the MAC and failed to qualify for the MAC tournament.

Previous season

The Broncos finished the season 8–23, 4–16 in MAC play to finish in last place. They failed to qualify for the MAC tournament.

On March 7, 2022, head coach Clayton Bates resigned after only two seasons. On April 5, the school named longtime Michigan State assistant Dwayne Stephens the team's new head coach.

Offseason

Departures

Incoming Transfers

Recruiting class

Roster

Schedule and results

|-
!colspan=9 style=|Exhibition

|-
!colspan=9 style=|Non-conference regular season

|-
!colspan=9 style=| MAC regular season

Source

References

Western Michigan Broncos men's basketball seasons
Western Michigan Broncos
Western Michigan Broncos men's basketball
Western Michigan Broncos men's basketball